Black Banner may refer to:
 Chernoe Znamia, a Russian anarchist organization
 the Black Standard of Muhammad in Islamic tradition 
 the Banner of the Mongols, used in wartime

See also
List of black flags